Matthew J. Cianciulli, Jr. (July 28, 1942 – November 15, 2008) was a Democratic member of the Pennsylvania House of Representatives.

References

Democratic Party members of the Pennsylvania House of Representatives
2008 deaths
1942 births
20th-century American politicians